The Couches de Saint Christophe are a sedimentary formation deposited between the Late Cretaceous and the Paleogene. It is a very monotonous sequence of calcitic sandstones and black schists. These are interpreted as a turbidite sequence. The average thickness of the unit is 500 m. The Couches de Saint Christophe are a post-rift sequence that overlies the Couches des Marmontains.

The Couches de Saint Christophe occupy the following nappes:
External Valais
Moûtiers unit
Roc de l'Enfer unit
Petit St. Bernard unit
Internal Valais
Versoyen unit

Large outcrops of the Couches de Saint Christophe crop out north of Bourg-Saint-Maurice.

The type locality of the formation is the Val de Bagnes in the canton Valais of Switzerland. It was first described by Rudolf Trümpy in 1952. The formation is named after a chapel to the northwest of Verbier.

The Saint Christophe Formation can be correlated with the Sassauna Formation found in Graubünden and calcareous flysch found in the Engadine.

References 

Geologic formations of France
Geologic formations of Switzerland
Upper Cretaceous Series of Europe
Cretaceous France
Cretaceous Switzerland
Cretaceous–Paleogene boundary
Paleogene France
Paleogene Switzerland
Sandstone formations

Geology of the Alps